Hôpital-Camfrout is a commune in the Finistère department and administrative region of Brittany in north-western France.

Population
In French the inhabitants of Hôpital-Camfrout are known as Hospitaliers or Camfroutois.

International relations
Hôpital-Camfrout is twinned with:
 Feock, United Kingdom

See also
Communes of the Finistère department
Parc naturel régional d'Armorique

References

External links

Official website 

Mayors of Finistère Association 

Communes of Finistère